Elk Fork is a stream in Pettis County in the U.S. state of Missouri. It is a tributary of Muddy Creek.

Elk Fork was so named on account of elk in the area.

See also
List of rivers of Missouri

References

Rivers of Pettis County, Missouri
Rivers of Missouri